Heath Charnock is a civil parish in the Borough of Chorley, Lancashire, England.  The parish contains 18 buildings that are recorded in the National Heritage List for England as designated listed buildings. Of these, one is listed at Grade II*, the middle grade, and the others are at Grade II, the lowest grade.  The parish is mainly rural, and most of the listed buildings are houses and associated structures, farmhouses and farm buildings.  The Leeds and Liverpool Canal passes through the parish, and there are five listed buildings connected with this, four bridges and an aqueduct.  The other listed structure is a milepost.

Key

Buildings

References

Citations

Sources

Lists of listed buildings in Lancashire
Buildings and structures in the Borough of Chorley